Hartpury is a civil parish in Gloucestershire, England. Geographically the parish is in Leadon Vale; administratively it is in the Forest of Dean. The Hartpury University and Hartpury College campus is based in the village.

Governance
An electoral ward in the same name exists. This ward runs north to Corse. The total ward population at the 2011 census was 2,496.

Architecture

The village has several interesting buildings including the former home of the Canning family, Hartpury House, now part of the college. Hill House, also known as The Hill, is a large timber-framed house which contains a sixteenth-century oak staircase and several plaster ceilings of the same period. The village hall was built in 2013 and won a design award from the Campaign to Protect Rural England (CPRE). There is a bee shelter near the church.

Notable people
The First World War poet F. W. Harvey was born at Marlsend, Murrell's End, Hartpury on 26 March 1888. His father was Howard Frederick Harvey, a farmer and horse dealer.  

Three time National Hunt champion jockey Terry Biddlecombe was born at Hartpury Court in 1941.

References

External links

Hartpury Parish Council
Hartpury Primary School

Civil parishes in Gloucestershire
Forest of Dean
Villages in Gloucestershire